Danil Nikolayevich Lipovoy (born 22 September 1999) is a Russian football player who plays for Volgar Astrakhan on loan from PFC Krylia Sovetov Samara. He plays as a wide midfielder, usually on the right.

Club career
He made his debut in the Russian Professional Football League for FC Dynamo-2 Moscow on 2 April 2017 in a game against FC Dynamo Saint Petersburg.

He made his debut for the main squad of FC Dynamo Moscow on 26 September 2018 in a Russian Cup game against FC Torpedo Moscow. He made Russian Premier League debut for Dynamo on 30 November 2018 in a game against FC Rubin Kazan, as a 64th-minute substitute for Miguel Cardoso.

On 23 August 2019, he joined FC Orenburg on loan.

On 11 August 2020, he was loaned to FC Khimki for the 2020–21 season. On 24 December 2020, his loan was terminated early and he returned to Dynamo.

On 23 June 2021, he signed a 3-year contract with PFC Krylia Sovetov Samara. On 25 January 2023, Lipovoy moved on loan to Volgar Astrakhan.

Career statistics

References

External links
 
 
 Profile by Russian Professional Football League

1999 births
Sportspeople from Kirov, Kirov Oblast
Living people
Russian footballers
Russia youth international footballers
Association football midfielders
Association football defenders
FC Dynamo Moscow players
FC Orenburg players
FC Khimki players
PFC Krylia Sovetov Samara players
FC Volgar Astrakhan players
Russian Premier League players
Russian Second League players